Sirník is a village and municipality in the Trebišov District in the Košice Region of south-eastern Slovakia.

History
In historical records the village was first mentioned in 1403.

Geography
The village lies at an altitude of 128 metres and covers an area of 5.822 km².
It has a population of about 605 people.

Ethnicity
The village is about 71% Slovak, 25% Hungarian and 4% Gypsy.

Facilities
The village has a public library.

External links
 http://www.statistics.sk/mosmis/eng/run.html
 http://picasaweb.google.com/zfp.kch/SirnKSzRnyeg6102007

Villages and municipalities in Trebišov District